"Blame It On Your Heart" is a song written by Harlan Howard and Kostas, and recorded by American country music artist Patty Loveless.  It was released in April 1993 as the first single from her album Only What I Feel.  A cover version by Deborah Allen was featured prominently in the 1993 film The Thing Called Love.

David Keith played the ex-boyfriend in the video.

"Blame It On Your Heart" was also recorded by Heidi Raye and released on Harlan Howard Records.

Content

The song and its video describes an ex-boyfriend who has "a lying, cheating, cold dead-beating, two-timing, double-dealing, mean-mistreating, loving" heart that he should blame for whatever backstabbing he gets from any other woman he does to what he did to its narrator.

Chart performance

The song charted for 20 weeks on the Billboard Hot Country Singles and Tracks chart, reaching No. 1 during the week of June 19, 1993.

Year-end charts

Music video 
The music video for "Blame It on Your Heart" was directed by Sherman Halsey, and premiered in early 1993.

Covers
 American Idol Season 8 contestant Allison Iraheta performed the song during that season’s Grand Ole Opry Week.
 River Phoenix performed the song in the 1993 film, The Thing Called Love, one of his final films before his death.
 Angela Watson performed the song in the Step By Step fifth season episode, "Don't Ask".
 Kiefer Sutherland performed the song on his second album, "Reckless & Me", in 2019.
 The Mavericks covered this song for the 2019 release “The Mavericks Play the Hits”.

References

1993 singles
1993 songs
Patty Loveless songs
Songs written by Kostas (songwriter)
Songs written by Harlan Howard
Song recordings produced by Emory Gordy Jr.
Epic Records singles
Music videos directed by Sherman Halsey
Deborah Allen songs